Thomas R. Patterson (born May 6, 1943) was an American politician in the state of Florida.

Patterson was born in Michigan and moved to Florida in 1965. He served in the Florida House of Representatives for the 2nd district from November 2, 1976, to November 2, 1982, as a Democrat.

References

1943 births
Living people
Democratic Party members of the Florida House of Representatives
People from Pensacola, Florida
People from East Lansing, Michigan